Granite City is a ghost town in the town of Wyoming, Waupaca County, Wisconsin, United States. The settlement was located in section 13 of the town of Wyoming, and had formed before Wyoming was split from the larger Town of Helvetia in 1890.

History
Granite City formed around what was described as "a rich granite quarry" owned by J. H. Leuthold and (partner) Holman. The quarry and town was served by a four-mile spur of the Milwaukee, Lake Shore and Western Railroad, and the town featured a store.

Notes

Geography of Waupaca County, Wisconsin
Ghost towns in Wisconsin